36 Canadian Brigade Group is a reserve component brigade of the Canadian Army, which Commands reserve units in 5th Canadian Division for Nova Scotia and Prince Edward Island. It was created in 1992 by merging the Nova Scotia Militia District and the Prince Edward Island Militia District.

Brigade units

References 

Brigades of the Canadian Army
Military units and formations established in 1992